Disavowed is a Dutch death metal band. They were formed in 2000 from the remnants of Nocturnal Silence.

History
Three songs were written and recorded soon after the band formed in 2000. A second demo CD entitled Point of Few resulted in a record deal with the American label Unique Leader Records. In 2001, the first full-length CD entitled Perceptive Deception was released, followed by a five-week tour in the United States and Canada in 2002 and a four-week European tour in 2003.

After a long period of wrist injuries of the drummer, Robbe Vrijenhoek, a temporally replacement was found in Dirk Janssen (Despondency) in mid 2005. After doing numerous regional shows Disavowed headed for Japan and Hong Kong in April 2006.

In May 2006, Romain Goulon (Aggressor, Arsebreed) joined Disavowed as the new drummer. After doing summer festivals, Disavowed started the recording of Stagnated Existence, the successor of Perceptive Deception, which was released on Neurotic Records in 2007. Robbert Kok [www.audiovisualz.com] took the lead in the recording and production of the new album, with assistance of the well-known Excess Studios. To promote Stagnated Existence, Disavowed joined Cannibal Corpse in March 2007 for a five-week European tour.

In mid 2008, Romain left Disavowed to play for Necrophagist, their busy schedule did not allow him to continue playing for Disavowed. Kevin Foley was recruited on drums in 2010 as a replacement. In 2017 Septimiu Hărşan (CodeRed, Necrovile, Pestilence) joined the band on drums.

After a long wait a new album is due for release in early 2020.

Current lineup
Robbert Kok — vocals
Daniel van den Broek — guitar
Gerben van der Bij — guitar
Nils Berndsen — bass
Septimiu Hărşan — drums

Former members
Kevin Foley — Drums
Romain Goulon — drums
Dirk Janssen — drums
Robbe Vrijenhoek  — drums
Joel Sta — guitars, vocals
Dorus Neijboer — guitars
Maarten Winnips — drums
Morten Løwe Sørensen - drums

References

External links
 Official website
 Disavowed on Facebook

Musical groups established in 2000
Dutch death metal musical groups
Dutch heavy metal musical groups
Musical quintets